Djustice Sears-Duru (born 24 May 1994) is a Canada international rugby union prop who plays for Ealing Trailfinders and the San Diego Legion in Major League Rugby (MLR). 

He previously played for the Seattle Seawolves and the LA Giltinis in the MLR.

He formerly played for Glasgow Warriors and Ontario Blues.

Rugby Union career

Amateur career

Sears-Duru has appeared for the Castaway Wanderers rugby club in the British Columbia Premier League. Sears-Duru played as a minor, junior and senior for the Crusaders Rugby Club in Oakville, Ontario.

Upon moving to Scotland to play for the Warriors, Sears-Duru has made some appearances for Ayr in the Scottish Premiership.

Professional career

Sears-Duru played for Ontario Blues.

He joined Glasgow Warriors on a short-term deal till the end of the 2015–16 season on 23 March 2016. This was then extended till the end of the 2016–17 season.

Sears-Duru made his debut for the Warriors in the pre-season match against Harlequins on the 20 August 2016.

On 20 February 2017 it was announced that Sears-Duru would leave the Warriors at the end of the season.

Sears-Duru rejoined Ontario Blues before joining Ealing Trailfinders for the 2017–18 season.

Club statistics

International career

Sears-Duru  made his debut for Canada in 2013 and was part of the Canada squad at the 2015 Rugby World Cup.

References

External links

1994 births
Living people
Ayr RFC players
Canada international rugby union players
Canadian expatriate rugby union players
Canadian expatriate sportspeople in England
Canadian expatriate sportspeople in the United States
Canadian people of Kenyan descent
Expatriate rugby union players in the United States
Glasgow Warriors players
Rugby union props
Seattle Seawolves players
Sportspeople from Edmonton
Canadian rugby union players
Ealing Trailfinders Rugby Club players
LA Giltinis players
San Diego Legion players